"Nipple to the Bottle" is a single by the Jamaican singer, model and actress Grace Jones, released in 1982.

Background
"Nipple to the Bottle" was the lead single from Jones' sixth studio album, Living My Life. The song was released in some territories as a double A-side single with "The Apple Stretching". In some countries, the single B-side featured "Cry Now, Laugh Later" or a dub version of "My Jamaican Guy"; all of these three tracks would later receive separate single releases. The front cover uses an image taken from her A One Man Show performance of "Demolition Man", with a group of Grace Jones "look-alikes" marching on across the stage. The song was performed by Grace in Julien Temple's 1983 film It's All True, made for BBC Arena series.

The single met with a considerable success, reaching Top 20 on Billboard R&B and dance charts. It did exceptionally well in New Zealand, where it became a number 3 hit.

Track listing
EU 7" single
A. "Nipple to the Bottle" – 4:22
B. "The Apple Stretching" – 3:33

US 7" single
A. "Nipple to the Bottle" – 3:59
B. "JA Guys" – 4:40

Canadian 7" single
A. "Nipple to the Bottle" – 4:17
B. "Cry Now - Laugh Later" – 4:29

US 7" promotional single
A. "Nipple to the Bottle" (long version) – 4:17
B. "Nipple to the Bottle" (short version) – 3:59

EU 12" single
A. "Nipple to the Bottle" – 6:59
B. "The Apple Stretching" – 8:40

US 12" single
A. "Nipple to the Bottle" – 6:57
B. "JA Guys" – 7:15

Canadian 12" single
A. "Nipple to the Bottle" – 6:54
B. "Cry Now - Laugh Later" – 6:08

Chart performance

References

1982 singles
Grace Jones songs
Songs written for films
Songs written by Grace Jones
Song recordings produced by Alex Sadkin
1982 songs
Island Records singles